Vitor Caetano Ferreira (born 1 July 1999) is a Brazilian professional footballer who plays as a goalkeeper for Figueirense.

Professional career
Caetano made his professional debut with Figueirense in a 0-0 Campeonato Brasileiro Série B tie with Oeste on 3 November 2019. On 8 July 2019, Caetano joined Famalicão on a year long loan.

References

External links
 
 ZeroZero Profile

1999 births
Living people
Sportspeople from Santa Catarina (state)
Brazilian footballers
Brazilian expatriate footballers
F.C. Famalicão players
Figueirense FC players
Primeira Liga players
Campeonato Brasileiro Série B players
Association football goalkeepers
Brazilian expatriate sportspeople in Portugal
Expatriate footballers in Portugal